Heavy Weather may refer to:

Heavy Weather (Wodehouse novel), a novel by P. G. Wodehouse
Heavy Weather (TV film), a 1995 adaptation of Wodehouse's novel
Heavy Weather (Sterling novel), a 1994 science fiction novel by Bruce Sterling
Heavy Weather (album), a 1977 album by Weather Report
"Heavy Weather" (song), a 2020 song by The Rubens
"Heavy Weather", a song by Diana Ross from The Force Behind the Power
"Heavy Weather", a song by Jarvis from Jarvis (album)